Dixie cups may refer to:
 Dixie Cup, a brand of paper cups
 The Dixie Cups, a 1960s American pop music girl group
 The round visorless sailor cap worn in the US Navy.